Ihor Kozlovskyi (born 16 February 1955) is a Ukrainian scientist, theologian, candidate of historical sciences, writer, public figure. Full member of the Shevchenko Scientific Society in Ukraine (Donetsk branch) since 2019. Senior researcher of the Department of Religious Studies of the Hryhorii Skovoroda Institute of Philosophy of the National Academy of Sciences of Ukraine.

President of the Centre for Religious Studies and International Spiritual Relations, Head of the Donetsk Regional Branch of the Ukrainian Association of Religious Studies, President of the Discovery Centre, Vice President of the Ukrainian Centre for Islamic Studies.

Member of the Expert Council on Freedom of Conscience and Religious Organizations at the Ministry of Culture of Ukraine. He is an advisor to the Minister of Culture, Youth, and Sports of Ukraine. Member of PEN Ukraine. Member of the initiative group «First of December».

Biography 
He was born on 16 February 1954 in Makiivka.

From 1972 to 1974 he served in the Border Troops in the Transcaucasia Border District on the border with Iran.

From 1975 to 1980 he studied at the Faculty of History of Donetsk State University and received a diploma with honours in «Historian. Teacher of history and social sciences».

In 1980–1984 he studied at the graduate school of the Institute of History of the National Academy of Sciences of Ukraine.

From 1980 to 2001 he worked in the Donetsk Regional Executive Committee, and then in the Donetsk Regional State Administration in various positions in the field of religion (officer, senior officer, chief specialist, head of the regional department of religion).

Since 1980 he has been teaching and lecturing on religious studies at universities in Ukraine and the United States.

Since 2001 he is Associate Professor of Religious Studies, Donetsk State Institute of Artificial Intelligence (later the State University of Informatics and Artificial Intelligence), head of the Centre for Religious Studies and International Spiritual Relations.

From 2011 to 2015 he worked as an associate professor at the Department of Philosophy of Donetsk National Technical University.

In 2012, he defended a dissertation for obtaining a scientific degree of a candidate of historical sciences in specialty «religious studies».

On 27 January 2016, he was captured by the militants of the so-called «Donetsk People's Republic» due to his pro-Ukrainian views, who subjected him to torture and held captive for almost two years. He was released on 27 December 2017.

He is author of more than 50 scientific books and more than 200 articles in dictionaries, encyclopedias, scientific periodicals, as well as poetic collections and prose works.

Rewards and honours 
For his peacekeeping activities was awarded the medal of the Austrian Society of Albert Schweitzer, Knight Order of the Royal Brotherhood of St. Feotonia (Portugal), Honours of the Academy Budo (Martial Arts) Nippon Seybucan (Japan). He is a valid member of the Royal College of Norkity (Portugal), as well as an honorary citizen of Oklahoma (USA).

Sources 

 Хроніка Донецького відділення Наукового Товариства ім. Шевченка / Упорядник і редактор В. С. Білецький. — Донецьк: НТШ, 2012. — Число 2. — 192 с.

References

External links 
"Understand the Ukrainian east: Conversation with Igor Kozlovsky"  from The Kyiv Review

1955 births
Living people
People from Makiivka
21st-century theologians
20th-century theologians
Members of the Shevchenko Scientific Society
Full Members of the National Academy of Sciences of Ukraine
Soviet Army personnel
Donetsk National University alumni
Soviet historians
Soviet theologians
Ukrainian historians
21st-century Ukrainian historians
20th-century Ukrainian historians
Academic staff of Donetsk National Technical University
Kidnapped Ukrainian people
Ukrainian torture victims
Ukrainian pacifists